Canite (also known as caneboard, pinboard, softboard) is a low density fibreboard panel made from sugar cane fibres. It is easy to handle, light weight and durable. Due to its low environmental footprint it is considered a sustainable building product. It may be used without finish, painted or rendered with natural lime-based products. It is commonly used for

 Interior wall and ceiling lining
 Pin boards, bulletin board
 Office partitions
 Protective covering boards
 Sound isolation and reflected sound reduction
 Door fillings
 Stucco background
Soundproofing under floorboards
 Fire lighter (saturated with paraffin)

In Australia, canite is commonly sold in 2400 x 1200 mm panels. Typical thickness is 10–13 mm. Typical density is 350 kg/m3.

References

Building materials